Salicarus is a genus of true bugs belonging to the family Miridae.

The species of this genus are found in Europe.

Species
The Catalogue of Life lists:
 Salicarus atlanticus (Wagner, 1963)
 Salicarus basalis (Reuter, 1878)
 Salicarus bimaculatus Zheng and H. Li., 1991
 Salicarus concinnus V. Putshkov, 1977
 Salicarus fulvicornis (Jakovlev, 1889)
 Salicarus halimodendri V. Putshkov, 1977
 Salicarus pusillus (Reuter, 1878)
 Salicarus qiliananus (Zheng and X. Li., 1996)
 Salicarus roseri (Herrich-Schaeffer, 1838)
 Salicarus urnammu Linnavuori, 1984

References

Miridae genera
Nasocorini